The Algerine-class gunvessel was a class of three Royal Navy composite gunvessels built in 1880. Two of them were sold after only ten years of service, but the other was converted to a survey ship before commissioning and survived in this role until 1907.

Design and construction
Designed in 1879 by Nathaniel Barnaby, the Chief Constructor of the Royal Navy, the Algerine-class gunvessels were similar to the s of 1875, but with the addition of a poop deck. It had been found that the addition of both poop and focsle made gunvessels far more comfortable in the tropics; an awning spread between the two allowed men to sleep on the upper deck during hot nights. The composite method of construction used iron for the keel, stem, stern post and framing, with wooden planking.  As well as the benefits of low cost, this construction allowed repairs to be conducted easily when away from well-equipped dockyards. This was the last class of composite gunvessels built for the Royal Navy.

Propulsion

Sail plan
The vessels of the class were barque-rigged, but some of the pictures show yards on the mizzen mast, which would have made them ship rigged. The advantage of the barque rig was the need for less manpower, but on a distant station and with an experienced crew, and infrequent coaling stops, captains sometimes preferred to gain the greater sailing benefits of the ship rig, and had the flexibility to do so.

Armament
The Algerine-class gunvessels were designed with one  (4½ ton) muzzle-loading rifles, two 64-pounder muzzle-loading rifles, two machine guns and a light gun. The single 7-inch gun was later replaced by a pair of 5-inch breech-loading guns.  Rambler, as a survey vessel, was finished with four 20-pounder breech loading guns, one machine gun and one light gun.

Service lives

HMS Rambler

Rambler was commissioned in 1880 and served on the China Station, including a survey in Western Australia.  In 1899 she contributed men to a naval brigade during the Boer War, and was sold in 1907.

HMS Ranger

Ranger served on the East Indies Station. In 1892 she was sold to the Liverpool Association for the Protection of Commercial Interests as Respects Wrecked and Damaged Property and carried out many of the more challenging salvage jobs, including on SS Suevic and HMHS Asturias. Extensive World War I work on charter to the Admiralty culminated in clearing the blockships left in the Zeebrugge Raid and the Ostend raid, together with the block ships the Germans had been able to place when evacuating before the Allies recaptured these ports.

HMS Algerine

Algerine commissioned in 1886, six years after she was launched.

Ships

Citations

References

Bastock, John (1988), Ships on the Australia Station, Child & Associates Publishing Pty Ltd; Frenchs Forest, Australia.

External links

 
 Algerine
Gunboat classes